Lauri Bergqvist (20 February 1930 – 13 December 2022) was a Finnish cross-country skier. He competed in the men's 50 kilometre event at the 1964 Winter Olympics.

Bergqvist died in Kouvola on 13 December 2022, at the age of 92.

Cross-country skiing results

Olympic Games

References

External links
 

1930 births
2022 deaths
20th-century Finnish people
Finnish male cross-country skiers
Olympic cross-country skiers of Finland
Cross-country skiers at the 1964 Winter Olympics
People from Kouvola
Sportspeople from Kymenlaakso